was a rural district located in southeastern Aichi Prefecture, Japan.

History
Hazu District was one of the ancient districts of Mikawa province, and was mentioned in Heian period Ritsuryō records under a variety of kanji spellings. Bordering on Mikawa Bay, one of its noted products was sharkskin and dried shark meat, which was sent as taxes to the Imperial household in Kyoto.

Modern Hazu District was created on 1 October 1889 as part of the cadastral reforms of the early Meiji period. Initially, it consisted of Nishio town, and 36 villages. On 13 May 1892, Isshiki and Yokosuka were elevated to town status. However, both reverted to village status in 1906, and in a round of consolidation, the remaining number of villages was reduced to 14. Isshiki regained its town status on 1 October 1923, followed by Yoshida and Hirasaku in 1924, Hazu in 1928, and Terazu in 1929, leaving the district with 6 towns and 6 villages by 1932.

On 15 December 1953, Nishio was elevated to city status, annexing the towns of Hirasaku and Terazu and two villages later that year. On 10 March 1955, Yoshida and the village of Yokosuka merged to form the town of Kira, leaving the district with three towns and no villages.

On 1 April 2011, Hazu, Isshiki, and Kira were merged into the expanded city of Nishio. Therefore, Hazu District was dissolved as a result of this merger.

External links
Counties of Japan

Former districts of Aichi Prefecture